Jérémi Ore Nekpadro Kimmakon (born 29 May 1994) is a French professional footballer who plays as a winger for Championnat National 2 club Granville.

Club career
Kimmakon was born in Lagny-sur-Marne, and is of Ivorian descent. At youth level, he played for several teams, including US Créteil-Lusitanos. He also spent four years at Châteauroux.

Kimmakon joined Paris Saint-Germain in 2014, and made his first team debut on 17 December 2014, in a 3–1 away win in the Coupe de la Ligue against Ajaccio. He replaced Lucas Moura after 83 minutes.

Ahead of the 2019–20 season, Kimmakon joined Les Herbiers. In May 2021, he signed for Granville.

International career 
Kimmakon received call-ups from French and Ivorian youth teams in the past. He was part of the Ivory Coast U17 national team that competed at the 2011 FIFA U-17 World Cup, but did not make an appearance in the tournament.

Honours
Paris Saint-Germain
Coupe de la Ligue: 2014–15

References

External links
 
 
 
 
 

1994 births
Living people
French footballers
Ivorian footballers
French sportspeople of Ivorian descent
Association football wingers
Championnat National 3 players
Championnat National 2 players
Serie D players
AC Boulogne-Billancourt players
US Créteil-Lusitanos players
LB Châteauroux players
Paris Saint-Germain F.C. players
AFC Bournemouth players
Bourges 18 players
Blois Football 41 players
Les Herbiers VF players
US Granville players
French expatriate footballers
French expatriate sportspeople in England
Expatriate footballers in England
French expatriate sportspeople in Italy
Expatriate footballers in Italy
People from Lagny-sur-Marne
Footballers from Seine-et-Marne